MADiSON is a first-person horror video game developed and published by the Argentine studio Bloodious Games. It was released on July 8, 2022 for Microsoft Windows, PlayStation 4, PlayStation 5, and Xbox Series X/S. The Nintendo Switch version was released on August 26, 2022.

Plot 
The game takes place in a large house, where the player takes control of Luca, a teenage boy who receives an instant camera for his 16th birthday. Said camera belonged to a serial killer 30 years earlier, and through it will contact the young man to put an end to a macabre ritual.

Gameplay 
MADiSON focuses on the use of an instant camera to connect the world of the living with that of the dead. In this way, the player will use the camera throughout the story to solve puzzles, discover secrets that cannot be seen with the naked eye, drive away demonic entities, among others.

Development 
The game began development in 2016, but was announced through a demo released on itch.io a year later. This demo was very well received by users, surpassing 100,000 downloads on the platform. The studio continued with the development of the video game and finally in 2021 announced its launch for PC through a trailer. Presenting the second trailer a month later on Gamescom, they revealed the official release date after 5 years of development, confirming that the game would be out on January 7, 2022.

The studio postponed the game's release to a later date in 2022, citing inconvenience in publishing the game under the previously used trade name, Nosebleed Games.

Release 
On release, MADiSON was noted as one of the 20 highest-selling games on Steam for the month of July.

MADiSON VR 
On January 30, 2023, the founder of BLOODIOUS GAMES, Alexis Di Stefano, officially announced the development of a virtual reality version called MADiSON VR. The announcement was made at a Perp Games Showcase via IGN. MADiSON VR will arrive later in 2023 for PSVR2 platforms with physical editions, and PCVR.

Reception 
MADiSON received an aggregate Metacritic score of 75/100 for its PC version, indicating "generally favorable" reviews, and 72/100 for its PS5 version, indicating "mixed or average reviews".

IGN awarded the game an 7/10, writing that Madison was a creepy game with genuine scares. Shacknews gave it 9 out of 10 stars, mentioned the game's writing as consistent, contrasting the usual trend of "a sluggish second act after an incredible opener". The reviewer praised the quality of the puzzles, tension that never decreased, and lore that was unpleasant "on a true crime level". HobbyConsolas stated that Madison was the most terrifying adventure they had played in a while.

MADiSON was scientifically recognized as the "Scariest Video Game of All Time", by The Science of Scare Project from Broadband Choices who has set out to scientifically measure the scariest forms of entertainment available. 200 participants were invited to play over 45 horror games released in the last three decades. In each case – the subjects’ heart rate was monitored during the game. The heart rate was measured while resting, right in the middle of the game, and the highest jumps in heart rate were recorded.
The respondents playing at Madison recorded an average of 97 beats / minute, and at the peak this rate stopped at 131 bps, with the new IP beating off established franchises such as Resident Evil and Silent Hill.

MADiSON was declared of cultural interest in Buenos Aires, Argentina.

Awards

References

External links 
 Official site

Single-player video games
Xbox Series X and Series S games
PlayStation 5 games
PlayStation 4 games
Nintendo Switch games
2020s horror video games
Video games developed in Argentina
Windows games
2022 video games
Indie video games